Westminster Airways was a British airline formed in 1946 to operate air charters. It later acquired freighter aircraft and was involved in the Berlin Airlift, but ceased operations shortly after.

History
The company was formed by a group of MPs led by Air Commodore A.V. Harvey, the first aircraft were seven twin-engined Airspeed Consuls. The Consuls operated charter flights from Blackbushe and Gatwick airports. Later in 1946 the company bought two Douglas DC-3s. To help with the Berlin Airlift the company bought three four-engined Handley Page Haltons, which were converted wartime Handley Page Halifax heavy bombers. A Halifax was also bought and converted into a bulk-diesel carrier for the airlift. The company ceased operations at the end of 1949 when the board of directors decided to cease flying due to the restrictions imposed on air charter companies by United Kingdom government policies and legislation.

Fleet
 Airspeed Consul
 Douglas DC-3
 Handley Page Halifax
 Handley Page Halton

Accidents and incidents
On 1 April 1949 one of the airlines Haltons crashed at RAF Schleswigland during the airlift.

Notes

References

 

Defunct airlines of the United Kingdom
Airlines established in 1946
1946 establishments in England
British companies established in 1946